Jan Pázler (born 10 January 1991) is a Czech former football player who played for various clubs in the Czech First League and Czech National Football League. He was twice top scorer of the National League. Pázler represented his country at under-21 level.

Career
Pázler joined Dukla Prague in the winter break of the 2010–11 season from city rivals Slavia Prague. He signed for Jablonec in the summer of 2012 but remained at Dukla on a season-long loan. In January 2013, during the league's winter break, his departure to Jablonec was confirmed. Towards the end of the season Pázler was involved in the final of the 2012–13 Czech Cup, although he remained an unused substitute in the match, which resulted in Jablonec winning the trophy.

It was announced in July 2013 that Pázler would play for Dukla on loan during the autumn part of the 2013–14 season. He returned to Jablonec in January 2014 during the league's winter break. In the summer of 2014, Pázler left Jablonec, signing with recently relegated Znojmo to play in the Czech 2. Liga.

Pázler spent three more seasons in the Czech National Football League with Hradec Králové, during which time he was the league's top scorer twice. However the club were not able to win promotion to the First League. He subsequently returned to the Czech First League with Liberec, but scored just two goals for his new club before returning to the second league to join FC Zbrojovka Brno on one year buy option loan in August 2019. After spending time with Viktoria Žižkov, Pázler rejoined Dukla in the summer of 2021.

Career statistics

References

External links
 Profile at FC Zbrojovka Brno official site

1991 births
Living people
People from Náchod
Czech footballers
Czech Republic youth international footballers
Czech Republic under-21 international footballers
Czech First League players
SK Slavia Prague players
FK Dukla Prague players
FK Jablonec players
1. SC Znojmo players
FC Hradec Králové players
FC Zbrojovka Brno players
Association football forwards
FC Slovan Liberec players
Czech National Football League players
FK Viktoria Žižkov players
Sportspeople from the Hradec Králové Region